Quogue Life-Saving Station is a historic U.S. government building at Quogue in Suffolk County, New York. It was built in 1912 by the United States Life-Saving Service in the Shingle Style, as a replacement for a deteriorating 1849-built station.  It is a -story gable-roofed structure.  It features a 4-story, wood-shingled tower topped by a hipped roof.

It was added to the National Register of Historic Places in 1999. The first Quogue life saving station was a garage-type building that was built in 1849 and involved with the rescues of the ships the “Infanti” (1851); and the “Europa” (1886). It was replaced in 1872 with a red house (wings were later added in 1887) and this life saving station participated in the rescue of the “Nahum Chapin” (1897); and the “Augustus Hunt” (1904). The original red house station still exists but was moved a few hundred yards eastward and is now used as a private home. The new Lorain style shingled Quogue Life-Saving Station with a four-story tower, designed by architect Victor Mendelheff, was built in 1912 and incorporated into the US Coast Guard in 1915. It is one of the few remaining examples of this type of structure and today it functions as a private home.

References

External links

 Quogue Life-Saving Station

Government buildings on the National Register of Historic Places in New York (state)
Shingle Style architecture in New York (state)
Government buildings completed in 1912
Buildings and structures in Suffolk County, New York
Life-Saving Service stations
1912 establishments in New York (state)
National Register of Historic Places in Suffolk County, New York
Life-Saving Service stations on the National Register of Historic Places
Historic district contributing properties in New York (state)
History of the United States Coast Guard
1915 establishments in the United States
1915 disestablishments in the United States